Zuzana Haasová (born 20 March 1981) is a Slovak actress and singer. Haasová played Soňa Jančová in the Slovak soap Panelák between 2008 and 2015. She performs music as part of the Susie Haas Band. Haasová has type 1 diabetes. She is the youngest of three sisters.

Selected filmography 
Najmenší hrdinovia (television, 1989)
Dvadsaťštyri hodín zo života istej ženy (TV film, 1994)
Pod vŕbou (TV film, 1994)
O krásnej strige (TV film, 1994)
O Zorali a dvoch bratoch (1994)
Škriatok	 (1995)
Silvánovci (1996)
Duchovia (1997)
Cruel Joys (2002)
Ordinácia v ružovej záhrade (television, 2007)
Panelák (television, 2008–2015)
Rex (television, 2017)

References

External links

1981 births
Living people
21st-century Slovak women singers
Slovak film actresses
Slovak television actresses
Actors from Bratislava
20th-century Slovak actresses
21st-century Slovak actresses
People with type 1 diabetes
Musicians from Bratislava